Reyhan (also Romanized as Reyḩān; also known as Reyḩānābād) is a village in Ravar Rural District, in the Central District of Ravar County, Kerman Province, Iran. At the 2006 census, its population was 271, in 80 families.

References 

Populated places in Ravar County